Antigua and Barbuda competed at the 1996 Summer Olympics in Atlanta, United States.

Athletics

Men
Track & road events

Women
Track & road events

Canoeing

Sprint
Men

Women

Cycling

Mountain Bike
Men

Sailing

Open

See also
Antigua and Barbuda at the 1995 Pan American Games

References
Official Olympic Reports
sports-reference

Nations at the 1996 Summer Olympics
1996
Olympics